Alexandru "Dudu" Frim (9 March 1908 – 2 December 1985) was a Romanian bobsledder who competed in the 1930s. He won the gold medal in the two-man event at the 1934 FIBT World Championships. He also finished 15th in the two-man event at the 1936 Winter Olympics in Garmisch-Partenkirchen. Frim was also an aviator, earning his pilot license in 1931. Frim also won the Grand Prix of Sports Aviation and Cup of Brasov Aero-Club in 1939. Frim later participated in World War II as a pilot for Romania.

References

Bobsleigh two-man world championship medalists since 1931
Romanian World War II profile of Frim

Dudu Frim, in Orizont Aviatic, Number 35, Volume IV, September 2005
Biography of Alexandru Frim 

1908 births
1985 deaths
Romanian aviators
Romanian male bobsledders
Romanian military personnel of World War II
Olympic bobsledders of Romania
Bobsledders at the 1936 Winter Olympics